Origanum is a genus of herbaceous perennials and subshrubs in the family Lamiaceae, native to Europe, North Africa, and much of temperate Asia, where they are found in open or mountainous habitats. A few species also naturalized in scattered locations in North America and other regions.

The plants have strongly aromatic leaves and abundant tubular flowers with long-lasting coloured bracts. The genus includes the important group of culinary herbs: marjoram (Origanum majorana) and oregano (Origanum vulgare).

With their decorative bracts, Origanum species and cultivars are used as ornamental plants in the garden. The cultivars 'Kent Beauty' and 'Rosenkuppel' have received the Royal Horticultural Society's Award of Garden Merit. 

Origanum species are used as food plants by the larvae of some Lepidoptera species, including Coleophora albitarsella.

Species
 Origanum acutidens (Hand.-Mazz.) Ietsw. - Turkey, Iraq
 Origanum × adanense Baser & H.Duman - Turkey   (O. bargyli × O. laevigatum)
 Origanum × adonidis Mouterde - Lebanon    (O. libanoticum × O. syriacum subsp. bevanii)
 Origanum akhdarense Ietsw. & Boulos - Cyrenaica region of eastern Libya
 Origanum amanum Post - Hatay region of Turkey
 Origanum × barbarae Bornm. - Lebanon    (O. ehrenbergii × O. syriacum subsp. bevanii)
 Origanum bargyli Mouterde - Turkey, Syria
 Origanum bilgeri P.H.Davis - Antalya region of Turkey
 Origanum boissieri Ietsw. - Turkey
 Origanum calcaratum Juss. - Greece
 Origanum compactum  Benth. - Spain, Morocco
 Origanum cordifolium (Montbret & Aucher ex Benth.) Vogel - Cyprus
 Origanum cyrenaicum Bég. & Vacc. - Cyrenaica region of eastern Libya
 Origanum dayi Post - Israel
 Origanum dictamnus L. – hop marjoram, Cretan dittany, dittany of Crete - endemic to Crete
 Origanum × dolichosiphon P.H.Davis - Seyhan region of Turkey    (O. amanum × O. laevigatum)
 Origanum ehrenbergii Boiss. - Lebanon
 Origanum elongatum (Bonnet) Emb. & Maire - Morocco
 Origanum floribundum Munby - Algeria
 Origanum × haradjanii Rech.f - Turkey    (O. laevigatum × O. syriacum subsp. bevanii)
 Origanum haussknechtii Boiss. - Turkey
 Origanum husnucan-baseri H.Duman, Aytac & A.Duran - Turkey
 Origanum hypericifolium O.Schwarz & P.H.Davis - Turkey
 Origanum × intercedens Rech.f. - Greece, Turkey    (O. onites × O. vulgare subsp. hirtum)
 Origanum × intermedium P.H.Davis - Denizli region of Turkey    (O. onites × O. sipyleum)
 Origanum isthmicum Danin - Sinai
 Origanum jordanicum Danin & Kunne - Jordan
 Origanum laevigatum Boiss. - Turkey, Syria, Cyprus
 Origanum leptocladum Boiss. - Turkey
 Origanum libanoticum Boiss. - Lebanon
 Origanum majorana L. – (sweet) marjoram - Turkey, Cyprus; naturalized in scattered locations in Europe, North Africa, North + South America
 Origanum × lirium Heldr. ex Halácsy - Greece   (O. scabrum × O. vulgare subsp. hirtum)
 Origanum × majoricum Cambess. – hardy sweet marjoram - Spain including Balearic Islands  (O. majorana × O. vulgare subsp. virens)
 Origanum microphyllum (Benth.) Vogel - Crete
 Origanum × minoanum P.H.Davis - Crete   (O. microphyllum × O. vulgare subsp. hirtum)
 Origanum minutiflorum O.Schwarz & P.H.Davis - Turkey
 Origanum munzurense Kit Tan & Sorger - Turkey
 Origanum × nebrodense Tineo ex Lojac - Sicily   (O. majorana × O. vulgare subsp. viridulum)
 Origanum onites L. - Greece, Turkey, Sicily
 Origanum × pabotii Mouterde - Syria   (O. bargyli × O. syriacum subsp. bevanii)
 Origanum pampaninii (Brullo & Furnari) Ietsw - Cyrenaica region of eastern Libya
 Origanum petraeum Danin - Jordan
 Origanum punonense Danin - Jordan
 Origanum ramonense Danin - Levant
 Origanum rotundifolium Boiss. - Turkey, Caucasus
 Origanum saccatum P.H.Davis - Turkey 
 Origanum scabrum Boiss. & Heldr. in P.E.Boissier - Greece
 Origanum sipyleum L. -Turkey, Greek Islands
 Origanum solymicum P.H.Davis - Antalya region of Turkey
 Origanum symes Carlström - Islands of the Aegean Sea
 Origanum syriacum L. - Turkey, Cyprus, Syria, Lebanon, Jordan, Palestine, Israel, Sinai, Saudi Arabia 
 Origanum vetteri Briq. & Barbey - Crete
 Origanum vogelii Greuter & Burdet - Turkey
 Origanum vulgare  L. - oregano - Europe, North Africa, temperate Asia (Iran, Siberia, Central Asia, China, etc.); naturalized in parts of North America, New Zealand, Venezuela

Formerly placed here
Pogostemon benghalensis (Burm.f.) Kuntze (as O. benghalense Burm.f.)

References

External links

 Herb Society of America Fact Sheet: Oregano and Marjoram (pdf)
Origanum dictamnus 

 
Lamiaceae genera
Taxa named by Carl Linnaeus